"She Wants to Be Me" is a song by British pop punk band Busted, co-written with the record production team The Matrix. It was first included on their second album A Present for Everyone in November 2003. A year later it was released as a limited edition single, one week later than planned, but because the format was a 3-inch CD it was not eligible to chart.

Busted performed the song on CD:UK in October 2004. A live version was included on both the single and the live album A Ticket for Everyone.

Track listing

References

2004 singles
Songs written by Lauren Christy
Songs written by Graham Edwards (musician)
Songs written by Scott Spock
Busted (band) songs
Songs written by Charlie Simpson
Songs written by James Bourne
Songs written by Matt Willis
2004 songs
Song recordings produced by the Matrix (production team)